The church of St Mary the Virgin, Hemingbrough is a Grade I listed building in Hemingbrough, district of Selby, North Yorkshire,  England. It is also known as Hemingbrough Minster.

History 

The building originates from the late 12th century CE, additions were made in the 13th, 14th, and 15th centuries. William the Conqueror gave the church to the prior and convent of Durham. On 26 October 1426 Henry VI gave licence to convert it into a collegiate church with residentiary canons whose period of residence was thirteen weeks each. From 1479 this also applied to the provost who until then was compelled to be resident for the greater part of the year. There were also three prebendaries, six vicars, and six clerks. The college was suppressed in 1545.

Architecture 

The church is of a cruciform layout and is built in the Decorated and later English style, although the windows in the north transept and the nave are Perpendicular. The tower is square and carries battlements and an octangular spire. The nave is aisled and has four bays, as has the south aisle of the chancel. The chapter house has three bays. The vestry lies to the north. North and south transepts have two bays each.

References 

Grade I listed churches in North Yorkshire
Selby District